Panic Prevention is the debut album by English indie rock singer-songwriter Jamie T, released in the United Kingdom on 29 January 2007. The album is so-called because of the panic attacks Jamie suffered as an adolescent. Most of the songs on the album deal with aspects of modern 'youth' culture in the UK (for example binge drinking), and as such has been strongly compared to the works of the Streets, Lily Allen and the Libertines. Three singles have been released from the album prior to its release: "Sheila", "If You Got the Money" and "Calm Down Dearest".

Track listing
All songs written by Jamie T except where noted.
"Brand New Bass Guitar" – 2:08
"Salvador" (Jamie T/Ben 'Bones' Coupland) – 3:32
"Calm Down Dearest" – 4:41
"So Lonely Was the Ballad" - 3.50
"Back in the Game" – 2:29
"Operation" (Jamie T/Ben 'Bones' Coupland) – 5:48
"Sheila" (Jamie T/John Betjeman/Jim Parker) – 4:19
"Pacemaker" – 3:26
"Dry Off Your Cheeks" – 5:03
"Ike & Tina" – 3:39
"If You Got the Money" (Jamie T/Ian Lewis) – 4:04
"Alicia Quays" – 6:29
"Northern Line" (bonus track) - 3:45
"Down to the Subway" (bonus track) - 3:25
"Here's Ya Getaway" (bonus track) - 4:42

Credits
Performed by Jamie T except:
 Pacemaker
James Dring - drum programming
Alfie 'Larrikin' Ambrose - bass
Coz 'Larrikin' Kerrigan - drums
Jason Cox - additional keyboards
Ike & Tina
James Dring - keyboards, drum programming
If You Got The Money
James Dring - drum programming
Jason Cox - additional percussion, keyboards
Luis Felber - guitar
James Dunston - bass
Ceri Evans - keyboards
Ben Coupland - drums
Northern Line (bonus track)
 Jason Cox, James Dring - keyboards, drum programming

Charts

Weekly charts

Year-end charts

Sales and certifications

References

2007 debut albums
Jamie T albums
Virgin Records albums
Albums recorded at Studio 13